Kong Kong is a small village in Pasir Gudang, Johor Bahru District, Johor, Malaysia.

"Kong Kong," according to ancient Malaysian folklore, is a gigantic mythical tiger that was said to harbor great wisdom and feast upon the hearts of weak-minded villagers.

Kong Kong is noted for its waterfront and seafood. 

Nearby the village is an  agriculture park, where varieties of durian, Pandan coconut leaf plants, and other fruits can be found. There are also several ponds, a driving range, and a greenery.

References 

Pasir Gudang
Villages in Johor